Ada is a feminine given name. One origin is the Germanic element "adel-" meaning "nobility", for example as part of the names Adelaide and Adeline. The name can also trace to a Hebrew origin, sometimes spelled Adah עָדָה, meaning "adornment". Ada means "first daughter" in NdiAniche-Uno in Arondizuogu, a clan among others of the Igbo People. Its equivalent for "first son" in the same clan is Tahitii and Okpara across all Igbo ethnic group in Nigeria. The Igbo people are one of the largest ethnic groups in Africa. Ada means "island" in Turkish, and it was the 35th most popular girls' name in Turkey in 2016. Finally, the name occurs in Greek mythology and was in use in Ancient Greece.

The name has seen a slight increase in popularity in the United States in recent years, where it was the 184th most common name given to baby girls born there in 2020. It had been among the top 100 names for girls in the United States between 1880 and 1912 and remained in the top 1,000 names for girls until 1985. It first reappeared among the top 1,000 names for girls in 2004, after a 19-year absence. Finnish variant Aada was among the top ten most popular names given to newborn girls in Finland in 2020.  The name is also commonly used in Norway, where it was the 10th most popular name for girls born in 2020. It ranked 28th for girls born in Turkey in 2020, ranked 38th for girls born in England and Wales in 2020, ranked 45th for girls born in Ireland in 2020, ranked 47th for girls born in Scotland in 2020, ranked 78th for girls born in Northern Ireland in 2020, ranked 81st for girls born in Poland in 2020, ranked 177th for girls born in Italy in 2020 and ranked 355th for girls in The Netherlands in 2020.

Its increase in popularity has been attributed to the popularity of other "simple, old-fashioned names beginning with a vowel" such as Ava and Ella. Some of its popularity might also be attributed to Ada, Countess of Lovelace, the daughter of George Gordon, Lord Byron, who has been called the first computer programmer by some historians. Ada, a computer programing language, was named in her honor. St. Ada was also the name of an early saint and of several medieval queens and princesses.

Notable people

Given name
 Ada of Caria (fl. 377–326 BC), satrap deposed by her brother Idrieus and restored by Alexander the Great
 St. Ada, 7th-century French abbess
 Ada or Adelais, 8th-century sister of Charlemagne, for whom the Ada Gospels at Trier were produced
Ada de Warenne (1120–1178), Anglo-Norman wife of Henry of Scotland, Countess of Northumbria and Huntingdon
 Ada of Huntingdon (1146–1206), Scottish noblewoman, Countess of Holland by marriage
 Ada of Holland, Margravine of Brandenburg (c. 1163 – 1205), daughter of Floris III, Count of Holland and his wife Ada of Huntingdon
 Ada, Countess of Holland (1188–1223), Countess of Holland between 1203 and 1207
 Ada, Countess of Atholl (died 1264)
Ada Adini (1855–1924), American operatic soprano who had an active international career from 1876
Ada Adler (1878–1946), Danish classical scholar and librarian
Ada Albrecht, Argentinian author
Ada Ameh (1974–2022), Nigerian actress
Ada Bakker (born 1948), Dutch tennis player
Ada Ellen Bayly (1857–1903), English novelist
Ada Kouri Barreto (1917–2005), eminent cardiologist
Ada Beveridge (1875–1964), Australian Country Women's Association leader
Ada Blackjack, (1898–1983), Inuit woman who was a castaway for two years on Wrangel Island in northern Siberia
Ada Bolten (1903–1984), Dutch swimmer
Ada Booyens (born 1961), South African race walker
Ada Bromham (1880–1965), Australian feminist and temperance activist
Ada Brown (judge) (born 1974), American federal judge
Ada Brown (singer) (1890–1950), American blues singer
Ada Buffulini (1912-1991), Italian anti-fascist campaigner
Ada Cambridge (1844–1926), later known as Ada Cross, English writer
Ada Carrasco (1912–1994), Mexican film and television actress
Ada Cavendish (1839–1895), English actress known for her Shakesperean roles and for popularising the plays of Wilkie Collins in America
Ada Nield Chew (1870–1945), British suffragist
Ada Choi (born 1973), Hong Kong actress best known for her work for TVB television
Ada Clare (1834–1874), born Jane McElhenney, American actress, writer, and feminist
Ada Colau (born 1974), Spanish activist and Mayor of Barcelona
Ada Langworthy Collier (1843-1919), American writer
Ada Comstock (1876–1973), American women's education pioneer
Ada Cornaro (1881–1961), prominent Argentine film and theatre actress, tango dancer and singer of the 1930s and 1940s
Ada Crossley (1874–1929), Australian singer
Ada de la Cruz (born 1986), Miss Dominican Republic 2009 and Miss Universe 2009 first runner-up
Ada Deer (born 1935), Native American advocate and scholar who served as head of the United States' Bureau of Indian Affairs from 1993 to 1997
Ada Dietz (1882–1950), American weaver best known for her 1949 monograph Algebraic Expressions in Handwoven Textiles
Ada Dondini (1883–1958), Italian film actress
Ada Constance Duncan (1896–1970), Australian welfare activist
Ada Dyas (1843–1908), Irish actress
Ada Ehi (born 1987),  Nigerian gospel singer
Ada María Elflein (1880–1919), Argentine poet, columnist, translator, feminist and teacher
Ada English (1875–1944), Irish revolutionary politician and psychiatrist
Ada Evans (1872–1947), Australian lawyer, was the first female law graduate in Australia
Ada and Minna Everleigh, sisters who operated the Everleigh Club, a high-priced brothel in the Levee District of Chicago after 1900
Ada Falcón (1905–2002), Argentine tango dancer, singer and film actress of the 1920s and 1930s
Ada Feinberg-Sireni (born 1930), Israeli politician
Ada Ferrer (born 1962), American historian
Ada Fisher (1947-2022), American retired physician and frequent Republican candidate for office
Ada Lois Sipuel Fisher (1924–1995), key figure in the Civil Rights Movement in Oklahoma
Ada Gabrielyan (born 1941), Armenian painter
Ada Sawyer Garrett (1856–1938), Chicago socialite of the late 19th century
Ada Gentile (born 1947), Italian pianist and composer
Ada Gilmore (1883–1955), American watercolorist and printmaker
Ada Gobetti (1902–1968), Italian journalist and politician
Ada den Haan (born 1941), Dutch swimmer
Ada R. Habershon (1861–1918), Christian hymnist, known for her 1907 hymn "Will the Circle Be Unbroken"
Ada Hegerberg, Norwegian football striker
Ada Howard (1829–1907), the first president of Wellesley College
Ada Verdun Howell (1902–1981), Australian author and poet
Ada Louise Huxtable (1921–2013), architecture critic and writer on architecture
Ada Maria Isasi-Diaz (1943–2012), professor emerita of ethics and theology at Drew University in Madison, New Jersey
Ada Itúrrez de Cappellini, Argentine politician
Ada J. Graves (1870–1918), British children's writer
Ada James (1876–1952), suffragist, social worker, and reformer
Ada Jones (1873–1922), popular mezzo-soprano who recorded from 1905 to the early 1920s
Ada Karmi-Melamede (born 1936), Israeli architect
Ada Katz (born 1928), wife and model of Alex Katz
Ada Kepley (1847–1925), the first American woman to graduate from law school
Ada van Keulen (1920–2010), Dutch World War II resistance member
Ada Copeland King, the common law wife of American geologist Clarence King
Ada King-Milbanke, 14th Baroness Wentworth (1871–1917), British peeress
Ada Kok (born 1947), Dutch swimmer
Ada Kramm (1899–1981), Norwegian stage and film actress
Ada Kuchařová (born 1958), Czechoslovakian orienteering competitor
Ada Annie Lawson or Cougar Annie (1888–1985), pioneer who settled on the west coast of Vancouver Island, Canada
Ada Lee, jazz, blues, gospel and soul music singer from Springfield, Ohio since the late 1950s
Ada Leverson (1862–1933), British writer who is now known primarily for her work as a novelist
Ada Limón (born 1976), American poet
Ada Lovelace (1815–1852), born Augusta Ada Byron, English writer, programmed Charles Babbage's mechanical computer, the analytical engine
Ada Lundver (1942–2011), Estonian actress and singer
Ada Mackenzie (1891–1973), Canadian golfer
Ada Maddison (1869–1950), British mathematician best known for her work on differential equations
Ada Maddocks (1927–2007), British trade union official
Ada Madssen (1917–2009), Norwegian sculptor
Ada Maimon (1893–1973), Israeli politician who served as a member of the Knesset for Mapai between 1949 and 1955
Ada Maris (born 1957), Mexican-American actress
Ada Marshania, ethnic Abkhaz and the Deputy of Supreme Council of the de jure Government of Abkhazia in exile since July 2006
Ada Maza (born 1951), Argentine Justicialist Party politician
Ada Menken or Adah Isaacs Menken (1835–1868), American actress, painter and poet
Ada Milby (born 1983), Filipino rugby player 
Ada Miller or Corín Tellado (1927–2009), prolific Spanish writer of romantic novels and photonovels
Ada Moldovan or Adriana Moldovan (born 1983), Romanian handball player
Ada Andy Napaltjarri (born 1954), Warlpiri and Luritja speaking Indigenous artist from Australia's Western Desert region
Ada Negri (1870–1945), Italian poet and writer
Ada Nicodemou (born 1977), Australian-born Greek-Cypriot actress, played Leah Patterson-Baker in the soap opera Home and Away
Ada Norris, DCMG, DBE (1901–1989), Australian women's rights activist and community worker
Ada M. Oredigger, pen name of Karl Emil Nygard (1906–1984), American Communist politician and first Communist mayor in the United States
Ada Palmer (born 1981), American writer
Ada Paterson (1880–1937), New Zealand school doctor, child health administrator and community worker
Ada Patterson (1867–1939), American print journalist
Ada Perkins (1959–1980), Puerto Rican beauty queen and contestant in the 1978 Miss Universe beauty pageant
Ada Pilgrim (1867–1965), New Zealand healer
Ada Polak (née Andrea Buch) (1914–2010), Norwegian art historian
Ada Pometti (born 1942), Italian actress
Ada Reeve (1874–1966), English actress of both stage and film
Ada Rehan (1859–1916), American actress
Ada Roach, American musical comedy actress
Ada Roe (1858–1970), British supercentenarian
Ada Rook, Canadian musician
Ada Dwyer Russell (1863–1952), Mormon stage actress
Ada Sari (1886–1968), Polish opera singer, actress, and educator
Ada Lewis Sawyer (1892–1985), American lawyer
Ada Holly Shissler, Associate Professor of Ottoman and Modern Turkish History at the University of Chicago
Ada Škerl (1924 - 2009), Slovene poet, writer and translator
Ada Smith (born 1945), New York State Senator from 1989 to 2006
Ada "Bricktop" Smith (1894–1984), African-American dancer, singer, vaudevillian, and self-described saloon-keeper
Ada Svedin (1900–1975), German actress
Ada Svetlova, Latvian singer, mezzo-soprano, performer of classical and ethnic repertoire
Ada Josephine Todd (1858-1904), American author and educator
Ada Udechukwu (born 1960), Nigerian artist and poet associated with the Nsukka group
Ada Mae Vaughn (1905–1943), movie actress
Ada Vélez (born 1970), Puerto Rican female professional boxer
Ada Vojtsik, Russian actress
Ada Overton Walker (1880–1914), African-American vaudeville performer and wife of George Walker
Ada Ward, English actress and singer who became a star in Australia in the 1870s, and later worked in the United States
Ada Wells née Pike (1863–1933), feminist and social worker in New Zealand
Ada Williams (actress) (1913–1975), American film actress
Ada Williams (baby farmer) (1875–1900), baby farmer convicted of killing 21-month-old Selina Ellen Jones in London
Ada Clendenin Williamson (1880–1958), American book illustrator
Ada Yonath (born 1939), Israeli crystallographer best known for her pioneering work on the structure of the ribosome

Middle name
Florence Ada Keynes (née Brown) (1861–1958), British author, social reformer, and Mayor of Cambridge in 1932
Mary Ada Pickford CBE (1884–1934), British politician, industrialist and historian
Florence Ada Mary Lamb Polson (1877–1941), New Zealand rural women's advocate
Caroline Ada Seville (1874–1955), New Zealand nurse, hospital matron and community leader

Surnames
Alma Flor Ada (born 1938), Cuban-American author of children's books, poetry and novels
Francisco Ada (1934–2010), Northern Mariana Islands politician
Gordon Ada (1922–2012), Australian microbiologist
Jacquette Ada (born 1991), Cameroonian footballer
Joseph Franklin Ada (born 1943), American politician
Kawa Ada (born 1982), Canadian actor, writer and producer
Marie-Noëlle Ada (born 1990), beauty queen, Miss Gabon 2012
Patrick Ada (born 1985), Cameroonian footballer

Fictional characters
Ada, in the video game Castlevania: Legacy of Darkness
Ada, an android in the comic book series Alex + Ada
 Ada, character in 1991 movie Armour of God II: Operation Condor
 Ada Clare, character in Charles Dickens' novel Bleak House
Ada Clover, a non-playable character in the BlazBlue video game series
Ada McGrath, protagonist of the 1993 film The Piano
 Ada Mesmer, a survivor in the video game Identity V
 Ada Monroe, character in Charles Frazier’s novel Cold Mountain
Ada Shufflebotham or Sidebottom, in the TV show Cissie and Ada
 Ada Thorne (née Shelby) in BBC TV drama Peaky Blinders
Ada Vessalius, in the animé Pandora Hearts
Ada Vinelander, character in the novel Ada or Ardor: A Family Chronicle by Vladimir Nabokov
Ada Wong, in Resident Evil video games
 Ada-1, a non-playable robot vendor in the video game Destiny 2.
 ADA, a character in the video game Ingress.

Notes

Feminine given names
English feminine given names
Dutch feminine given names
Norwegian feminine given names
Turkish feminine given names